Thomas Edward Hopper (born 28 January 1985) is a British actor. He has appeared as Percival in Merlin, Billy Bones in Black Sails, Dickon Tarly in Game of Thrones, and Luther Hargreeves in The Umbrella Academy.

Early life
Thomas Edward Hopper was born on 28 January 1985 in Coalville, Leicestershire. He attended Newbridge High School and Ashby School, where he first developed an interest in acting. He enrolled in a drama class and appeared in a production of the musical Return to the Forbidden Planet. He studied acting at Rose Bruford College.

Career
Hopper was cast in As You Like It at the Watford Palace Theatre and has appeared in various television programmes and films including Saxon, Casualty, Kingdom and Doctors. Hopper portrayed Marcus in the comedy-horror film, Tormented about a bullied teenager who comes back from the dead to take revenge on his classmates. The film was released in May 2009.

In 2010, he was in an episode of Doctor Who. Hopper played Sir Percival in the BBC series Merlin. He joined the series in the third season in 2010, and was a regular for the next two seasons. After Merlin ended in 2012, he featured in Good Cop in 2012. In 2013, Hopper starred in Cold, directed and written by his Merlin co-star Eoin Macken. The film was later released in the United States as Leopard. In 2014, Hopper starred as Asbjörn in Northmen: A Viking Saga.

Hopper became the first actor to join the Starz series Black Sails, in which he portrayed Billy Bones. The pirate drama serves as a prequel to Robert Louis Stevenson's Treasure Island. Hopper deliberately chose to play Bones as a "selfless person, looking out for his crew", believing that the character would have changed dramatically in the time period between Black Sails and Treasure Island. The show was filmed on location in South Africa.

In 2016, Hopper appeared in the thriller Kill Ratio and an episode of Barbarians Rising. The following year, he joined the cast of the HBO series Game of Thrones in season 7 as Dickon Tarly, replacing Freddie Stroma who had previously appeared in the role in season 6. In 2018, Hopper appeared alongside Amy Schumer in I Feel Pretty. In 2019, Hopper appeared as Luther Hargreeves in The Umbrella Academy. For the role, Hopper wore a muscle suit to achieve the correct look and underwent martial arts training.
Hopper appeared in the 2020 film SAS: Red Notice. In March 2019, he joined the cast of Hitman's Wife's Bodyguard.
Hopper starred in the Netflix film Love in the Villa which premiered 1 September 2022.

Personal life
Hopper married actress Laura Higgins in 2014. They have a son and daughter.

Filmography

Film

Television

References

External links
 
 

1985 births
Alumni of Rose Bruford College
English male film actors
English male television actors
Living people
Male actors from Leicestershire
People from Coalville
21st-century English male actors